Peter Molloy may refer to:

Peter Molloy (footballer, born 1909) (1909–1993), English football player & manager, also known as Pat Molloy
Peter Molloy (footballer, born 1921) (1921–1973), Irish footballer
Paddy Molloy (hurler) (1934–2020), Irish hurler
Pat Molloy (darts player), Australian darts player